Alice Goodman, Lady Hill is an American poet and librettist.  She is also an Anglican priest, working in England.

Biography
Goodman was born in St. Paul, Minnesota, and attended and graduated from Breck School.
She was educated at Harvard University and Girton College, Cambridge, where she studied English and American literature. During the 1980s she published poems in venues such as Poetry and the London Review of Books. She received her Master of Divinity degree from the Boston University School of Theology. She has written the libretti for two of the operas of John Adams (Nixon in China and The Death of Klinghoffer) and the text of a cantata by Tarik O'Regan (A Letter of Rights). Goodman resumed writing with John Adams on the opera Doctor Atomic, but withdrew from this project after a year.

She was raised as a Reform Jew, and converted to Christianity in 1989, as an adult. In 2006, Alice Goodman took up the post of chaplain at Trinity College, Cambridge, and in 2011 became Rector of a group of parishes in Cambridgeshire including Fulbourn.

Goodman married the noted English poet Geoffrey Hill in 1987. The couple have one daughter, Alberta.

References

External links
Dyer, Richard, "'Klinghoffer' librettist revels in power of words", Boston Globe, 1 September 1991, (subscription access)

White, Michael "Controversy gets another hearing", Los Angeles Times, 30 August 2005, p. E2
Trinity College, Cambridge, Rev. Alice Goodman

Living people
Writers from Saint Paul, Minnesota
Converts to Anglicanism from Judaism
Harvard University alumni
Anglican poets
Jewish American poets
American opera librettists
Women opera librettists
Alumni of Girton College, Cambridge
American emigrants to England
American librettists
American women poets
Women Anglican clergy
Boston University School of Theology alumni
Wives of knights
21st-century American Jews
Year of birth missing (living people)
21st-century American women